Zack Williams (born March 2, 1997) is a professional Canadian football offensive lineman for the Calgary Stampeders of the Canadian Football League (CFL).

Early career
Williams first played football at Murdoch MacKay Collegiate in grade 10 and was selected to Team Canada in 2014. He played junior football for the Winnipeg Rifles in grade 12.

University career
Williams played U Sports football for the Manitoba Bisons from 2015 to 2018. He played in 32 regular season games for the program.

Professional career
Williams was drafted in the third round, 28th overall, by the Calgary Stampeders in the 2019 CFL Draft and signed with the team on May 13, 2019. He began the 2019 season on the practice roster, but made his professional debut on October 5, 2019, against the Montreal Alouettes. He played in two regular season games during his rookie season. Williams did not play in 2020 due to the cancellation of the 2020 CFL season.

In 2021, Williams played in all 14 regular season games and started at left guard in 13 of them. He made his playoff debut in the West Semi-Final loss to the Saskatchewan Roughriders where he started at left guard. Williams continued his strong play in 2022 starting all 18 regular-season games. Following the season he signed a two-year contract extension with the Stamps.

Personal life
Williams was born to parents Tracy and Owen Williams and has one sister and one brother.

References

External links
 Calgary Stampeders bio

1997 births
Living people
Calgary Stampeders players
Canadian football offensive linemen
Canadian Junior Football League players
Manitoba Bisons football players
Players of Canadian football from Manitoba
Canadian football people from Winnipeg